Wilhelm Huber, best known as Willy Huber (17 December 1913 – August 1998) was a Swiss football goalkeeper who played for Switzerland in the FIFA World Cup in 1934 and 1938. He also played for Grasshopper Club Zürich. He was Switzerland's Goalkeeper of the Year in 1937, 1942 and 1943.

Career
Huber played for FC La Sarraz and for FC Blue Stars Zürich before he played for Grasshopper Club Zürich, with whom he won the Swiss championship in 1936-37, 1938–39, 1941–42 and 1942–43 and the Swiss Cup in 1933-34, 1936–37, 1937–38, 1939–40, 1940–41, 1941–42, 1942–43, thus winning the double in 1936-37, 1941–42 and 1942-43. Only Severino Minelli and Alfred Bickel, with eight victories each, have won the cup more often than his seven cup victories, and otherwise only Hermann Springer has equalled this total.

He ended his career at FC Zürich.

References

External links

1913 births
Footballers from Zürich
Swiss men's footballers
Switzerland international footballers
1934 FIFA World Cup players
1938 FIFA World Cup players
Association football goalkeepers
Grasshopper Club Zürich players
Year of death missing